Sierra de Gata is a comarca at the northern end of province of Cáceres in Extremadura, one of Spain's seventeen Autonomous Communities. The mountain range of Sierra de Gata is in the area and has given its name to the comarca. The main town is Moraleja.

This comarca borders with Portugal in the west in the area of the Portuguese Serra da Malcata Natural Reserve.
There are linguistic affinities between this comarca and neighboring Las Hurdes.

Municipal terms
The traditional names of the towns and aldeas are in brackets.

Acebo (L'Acebu)
Cadalso (Cajarsu)
Cilleros (Cillerus)
Parrera
Descargamaría 
Eljas (As Ellas)
El Soto (U Soitu)
Gata
Moheda de Gata (La Mueda)
Hernán Pérez (Jerranperris)
Hoyos (Joyus)
Moraleja 
Cañadas
Malladas
La Mata
Pedrizas
Porciones
La Quinta
Rozacorderos
Perales del Puerto (Peralis)
Robledillo de Gata (Robleillu)
San Martín de Trevejo (Sa Martín de Trebellu)
Santibáñez el Alto (Santibañis l'Altu)
Torre de Don Miguel 
Torrecilla de los Ángeles (Torrecilla de los Ángilis)
Valverde del Fresno (Valverdi du Fresnu)
Vegaviana 
Villamiel 
Trevejo (Treveju)
Villanueva de la Sierra (Villanueva)
Villasbuenas de Gata (Villasgüenas)

References

External links 
 Página oficial de la comarca de Sierra de Gata

Province of Cáceres
Comarcas of Extremadura

es:Sierra de Gata